Poughkeepsie Underwear Factory is a historic factory building located at Poughkeepsie, Dutchess County, New York.  It was built in 1874 and is a -story, eight-bay brick building.  It was expanded about 1887.

It was added to the National Register of Historic Places in 1982.

History 
The Poughkeepsie Underwear Factory property was built in 1874 as William S. Patten's Poughkeepsie Live Oak Leather Manufactury, and shortly thereafter became the Dutchess Manufacturing Company, which added on substantially to the original structure.

By 1895 it was William Paulding's Cooperage. In 1899 the Queen Undermuslin Company was incorporated, and in 1904 it moved from a location on Mill Street into this building, forever leaving its mark on the property now known as the Poughkeepsie Underwear Factory.

The building was remodeled to accommodate the unique offerings of Queen Undermuslins, and was highly regarded as a building entirely run on electricity.  

The garments produced at the factory were held in very high regard, and shipped around the world. The high quality of the product was confirmed by the Galveston Cotton Carnival and Exposition, where Queen Undermuslins took home top prize.

The company produced 60,000 garments annually, exclusively for women and children, and able to be procured "at any dry goods or furnishing house of any importance."

The owners of the factory, Robert Stuart and JC MacLean, were certainly progressive employers. Records show them as successful inventors and businessmen.

Employees (all women) were involved in resolving business disputes, and the grounds were lauded for their beautiful condition, included a perfectly manicured privet hedge, a large flower bed at the front of the site, and even a tennis court for recreation for the employees.

Not much is known about the history of the building from the mid-twentieth century onward. Later pictures show it as Central Press; no details exist about that operation that we are aware of. The building was vacant by the 1980s.

Redevelopment 
The redevelopment of the Poughkeepsie Underwear Factory is the anchor project in Hudson River Housing's work to revitalize the Middle Main Street corridor. This Hudson Valley nonprofit renovated this three story, 22,000 square foot building as mixed-use, with two thirds consisting of apartments, and one third as a commercial community hub.

 First Floor/Lower Level
 Poughkeepsie Open Kitchen (POK): a shared-use commercial kitchen with affordable dry and cold storage available for kitchen members at the lower level.
 A cafe space available for rent to community members for events and by Open Kitchen members for pop-up events
 Little Loaf Bakeshop who operates the retail space in the cafe Thursday - Saturday, 8am -1pm.
 Second Floor
 PUF (Poughkeepsie Underwear Factory) Studios: Flexible artist studio spaces available for artists and artisans on a monthly basis and printmaking open studios and art classes for the public.  
 Third Floor
 The Art Affect: Sparks Media Project and Mill Street Loft, two of the Hudson Valley's leading arts organizations have merged and now utilize space in the factory for youth arts programming.
 Fifteen Loft Apartments:  A variety of studios and one bedroom apartments for individuals and families to work and live. Every unit, on all three floors, is ADA accessible.

See also 
 Northwestern Knitting Company Factory building: underwear factory on the NRHP
 Richmond Underwear Company Building: underwear factory on the NRHP

References

External links 
 web site

Industrial buildings and structures on the National Register of Historic Places in New York (state)
Industrial buildings completed in 1874
Buildings and structures in Poughkeepsie, New York
Undergarments
National Register of Historic Places in Poughkeepsie, New York
Textile mills in New York (state)
1874 establishments in New York (state)